Yoshihisa Yamamoto may refer to:

 Yoshihisa Yamamoto (scientist)
 Yoshihisa Yamamoto (wrestler)